Pampanga's 4th congressional district is one of the four congressional districts of the Philippines in the province of Pampanga. It has been represented in the House of Representatives since 1987. The district consists of municipalities in southern and eastern Pampanga, namely Apalit, Candaba, Macabebe, Masantol, Minalin, San Luis, San Simon and Santo Tomas. It is currently represented in the 19th Congress by Anna York Bondoc of the Nacionalista Party.

Representation history

Election results

2022

2019

2016

2013

2010

See also
Legislative districts of Pampanga

References

Congressional districts of the Philippines
Politics of Pampanga
1987 establishments in the Philippines
Congressional districts of Central Luzon
Constituencies established in 1987